The Nouvelle station was a railway station in Nouvelle, Quebec, Canada. It was formerly a Via Rail flag stop serving the Montreal-Gaspé train, but passenger service east of Matapédia station was suspended in 2013. It was served by the Montreal – Gaspé train three days a week in each direction towards Montreal or Gaspé.

The station, which handled both freight and passenger traffic, is a wooden framed shingle building. It is on the corner of Maguire Street and Station Street (Rue Maguire and Rue de la Gare). Nearby attractions include the Miguasha National Park.

References

External links 
 

Via Rail stations in Quebec
Railway stations in Gaspésie–Îles-de-la-Madeleine
Disused railway stations in Canada